"Hooked on a Feeling" is a 1968 pop song, written by Mark James and originally performed by B. J. Thomas. Thomas's version featured the sound of the electric sitar (played by Reggie Young) and reached No. 5 in 1969 on the Billboard Hot 100.

It has been recorded by many other artists, including Blue Swede, whose version reached No. 1 in the United States in 1974.

Production 
The song was written by Mark James, who was introduced to producer Chips Moman around 1967 by Moman's mutual friend Steve Tyrell, a singer and James' manager. James was hired by early 1968 to write for Moman's publishing company, which led to him writing songs for many artists, including his childhood friend B.J. Thomas. One of these songs was "Hooked on a Feeling", which James wrote about the thrills of being in love, inspired by his feelings for his childhood sweetheart. It was recorded at the American Sound Studio in Memphis, Tennessee in 1968, and first released on October 29 of that year. Country artist Louise Mandrell and RC Bannon also recorded and released this song in 1979.

Chart performance

Covers

Twinkle Brothers 
In 1971, Jamaican reggae band Twinkle Brothers released a reggae cover of the song with ooga chaka chants and a brass arrangement also know from later cover versions.

Jonathan King 
In 1971, British musician Jonathan King recorded a cover version of the song, also with ooga chaka chants. King described it as "a reggae rhythm by male voices". His version reached number 23 on the UK Singles Chart in November 1971.

Blue Swede 

In 1974, the Swedish pop rock group Blue Swede did a cover version, which included the ooga chaka introduction from earlier covers. The Blue Swede version of the song also tweaked the lyrics to avoid a drug reference. This version reached No. 1 in the United States. Billboard ranked it as the No. 20 song for 1974. On 25 July 2012, the 1974 live performance by Blåblus video was officially uploaded to YouTube; it has generated nearly 6 million views as of October 2022.

Record World said that "the opening hook will have buyers crying for the 'oogch chugga' record."

In 1992, Blue Swede's recording was featured on the soundtrack of Quentin Tarantino's debut feature Reservoir Dogs. 

In 1998, during an episode of the legal comedy-drama series Ally McBeal, "Cro-Magnon", the main character's neurosis about being able to conceive a child before her biological clock runs out is illustrated by her imagining a computer generated baby dancing into her bedroom to Blue Swede's recording of "Hooked on a Feeling". A website featuring the dancing baby and the Blue Swede recording became an internet meme, further cementing the scene in pop culture history.

The 2014 feature film Guardians of the Galaxy, which featured the brass fanfare and title lyrics of the Blue Swede cover version prominently in its trailers and theatrical release, resulted in a significant spike in sales for the recording; the film's soundtrack reached the top of the Billboard 200 chart in August 2014. The song was also featured heavily in the teaser trailer for the 2017 sequel, Guardians of the Galaxy Vol. 2, although the song was not used in the actual film.

Certifications

References

External links 
  (B.J. Thomas)

1968 songs
1968 singles
1971 singles
1974 debut singles
B. J. Thomas songs
Blue Swede songs
Jonathan King songs
Billboard Hot 100 number-one singles
Cashbox number-one singles
Songs written by Mark James (songwriter)
Scepter Records singles
EMI Records singles
Song recordings produced by Chips Moman
Internet memes introduced in the 1990s